Leucopodella  is a genus of hoverflies.

Species
L. bigoti (Austen, 1893)
L. gracilis Fluke, 1945
L. guianica Reemer, 2010

References

Diptera of South America
Hoverfly genera
Syrphinae